Amon: Feasting the Beast is a compilation album by American death metal band Deicide. It was released in 1993 by Roadrunner Records. It is a compilation of the two demos the band released when they were called Amon.

Track listing
All lyrics written by Glen Benton, all music written by Deicide.
"Lunatic of God's Creation" – 2:51
"Sacrificial Suicide" – 2:56
"Crucifixation" – 3:49
"Carnage in the Temple of the Damned" – 3:07
"Dead by Dawn" – 4:00
"Blaspherereion" – 4:16
"Feasting the Beast (Intro)" – 0:51
"Sacrificial Suicide" – 2:57
"Day of Darkness" – 2:12
"Oblivious to Nothing" – 2:48

Personnel
Glen Benton – bass; vocals
Eric Hoffman – guitars
Brian Hoffman – guitars
Steve Asheim – drums
Deicide – production
Scott Burns – mixing
Chris Gehringer – mastering

References

1993 albums
Deicide (band) compilation albums
Roadrunner Records albums